Aleksey Lelin (born 27 November 1977) is a Belarusian athlete. He competed in the men's high jump at the 2000 Summer Olympics.

References

1977 births
Living people
Athletes (track and field) at the 2000 Summer Olympics
Belarusian male high jumpers
Olympic athletes of Belarus
Place of birth missing (living people)